The History of an Artist, Vol. 1 is a 1972 studio album by Oscar Peterson, the first of two albums so titled to provide a retrospective of his career. 

The History of an Artist series marked Peterson's first recordings for Norman Granz' new record label, Pablo Records. Peterson had previously recorded for Granz' three former labels, and would remain with Pablo until the mid-1980s.

Track listing
 "R.B. Blues" (Ray Brown) – 3:55
 "I Wished on the Moon" (Dorothy Parker, Ralph Rainger) – 7:36
 "You Can Depend on Me" (Charles Carpenter, Louis Dunlap, Earl Hines) – 6:55
 "This Is Where It's At" (Oscar Peterson) – 7:50
 "Okie Blues" (Peterson) – 8:45
 "I Want to Be Happy" (Irving Caesar, Vincent Youmans) – 4:20
 "Texas Blues" (Peterson) – 7:35
 "Main Stem" (Duke Ellington) – 5:10
 "Don't Get Around Much Anymore" (Ellington, Bob Russell) – 3:12
 "Swamp Fire" (Harold Mooney) – 2:52
 "In a Sentimental Mood" (Ellington, Manny Kurtz, Irving Mills) – 5:09
 "Greasy Blues (for Count Basie)" (Peterson) – 5:20
 "Sweety Blues (for Harry "Sweets" Edison)" (Peterson) – 2:59
 "Gay's Blues" (Peterson) – 6:00
 "The Good Life" (Sacha Distel, Jack Reardon) – 5:15
 "Richard's Round" (Peterson) – 4:20
 "Lady of the Lavender Mist" (Ellington) – 4:15

Personnel
 Oscar Peterson - piano
 Herb Ellis - guitar
 Irving Ashby - guitar
 Barney Kessel - guitar
 Ray Brown - double bass
 George Mraz - double bass
 Niels-Henning Ørsted Pedersen - double bass
 Sam Jones - double bass
 Bobby Durham - drums

References

Albums produced by Norman Granz
1972 compilation albums
Oscar Peterson compilation albums
Pablo Records compilation albums